This is a list of heraldic charges. It does not cover those charges which are geometrical patterns and resemble partitions of the field; for these, see Ordinary (heraldry).

Fox-Davies (1909) in his presentation of common heraldic charges divides them into the following categories (not including ordinaries and subordinaries): the human figure, the heraldic lion, beasts (mammals), monsters, birds, fish, reptiles, insects, plants (trees, leaves, fruits and flowers), and "inanimate objects".

Subordinaries

A number of simple geometric shapes have traditionally, and somewhat arbitrarily, been classified among the so-called subordinaries. (All other mobile charges are called common charges.)

 lozenge 
 fusil (a narrow lozenge; the term originally referred to a cone-shaped pulley, from Latin fūsus, "spindle")
 mascle (lozenge voided; related to "mesh")
 rustre (lozenge pierced; from German Raute, "rhombus")
 billet (a rectangle)
 annulet (a ring) 
 roundel, but different tinctures have different names: for example roundels argent are called plates. A roundel barry wavy azure and argent is called a fountain.
 label: commonly a mark of difference, but also appears as an independent charge.
 fret: originally woven from three bendlets (dexter) and three bendlets sinister, now usually a single bendlet each way interwoven with a mascle.

Human figures

Soldiers, armed men
Two armed men in combat, for Manesse (Zürich armorial, c. 1340)
A Cossack appears in the arms of Cherkasy, Ukraine.
Cossack with musket
Rider
Saint George and the dragon
Pahonia
A pilgrim (St Fridolin) for Glarus
Wild men
for Klosters and the League of Ten Jurisdictions (16th century)
Virgin and Child with Saint Anne for Annaberg-Buchholz (1501)
A maid holding a wreath, for Magdeburg
A woman holding a book, for Iwye
A child (later also a Moor or Turk) being devoured by the Biscione (serpent), for Visconti of Milan
A crowned Moorish queen for the counts of Kirchberg, Swabia (13th century), hence the municipal arms of Illerkirchberg

Parts of human bodies

 The head
Maure
Skull and crossbones
Totenkopf
Turk head
The hand, or hand and arm, is the most common part of the human body to be a charge.
Arm and hammer
Eye
Eye of Providence
 The ear
Feet
(human) foot sole
 Teeth
 Tongue
 The heart, even when blazoned "a human heart", always appears like the heart in a deck of cards rather than a natural human heart.
 A "dug" or woman's breast "distilling drops of milk" famously appears in the arms of the Dodge family, and appeared for a time on the badge of cars made by the Dodge Automotive company.
 Beards
 Testicles: the Neapolitan family of Coglione bore per fess argent and gules, three pairs of testicles counterchanged. The similar coat of the Counts Colleoni of Milan is sometimes blazoned Per pale argent and gules, three hearts reversed counterchanged.

Beasts

Any animal can be a heraldic charge, although more traditional ones vary in the exactitude with which they resemble the creature as found in nature. Animals depicted naturally are either described as natural or using the scientific nomenclature.

Predatory beasts

Felines
 The lion.
 The heraldic tyger is an imaginary monster; where the natural beast appears it is blazoned as a Bengal tiger.
 A leopard refers to a lion "passant guardant", rather than a natural leopard, in the languages of French and English heraldry. A leopard's face also occurs, sometimes jessant-de-lys.
 A heraldic panther is usually depicted spitting fire
 The (domestic) cat, distinguished from the wild cat or "cat-a-mountain"
 Sabre-toothed cat
Canines
 Fox
 Hound (dog). The two most common breeds are the talbot (dog) and greyhound.
 Wolf
 Bear
 Brock or (badger)
 Martens
 Weasels such as the Ferret and the Ermine (stoat)
 Otter
 Thylacine

Ungulates
Antelope, usually blazoned as a specific type unless it is the mythical heraldic antelope.
 Cattle Bulls, cows or calves.
 Zebu
 Camel
 Deer usually a red deer, also called a hart or Stag, and the Buck denotes a Fallow deer. Females are called hinds or does.
 Irish elk
 Stags
 Caribou or Reindeer. Sometimes depicted naturally, sometimes as a deer with four antlers.
 Equines such as the ass and the horse sometimes of a specified breed and the unicorn and Pegasus.
 Hippopotamus
 Rhinoceros
 Swine either wild boars or domestic pigs
 Sheep and Goats Including Rams, ewes, lambs, ibex and Agnus Dei

Other mammals
Marsupials
Bandicoots and Bilbies
 Kangaroos, Wallaroos, and Wallabies
 Koala
 Opossums 
 Possums
 Wombat
 Monotremes such as Platypuses and Echidnas
 Apes and Monkey (or jack-a-napes), rarely "sea-monkey" (a monkey with a fish-tail).
 Proboscideans such as the Mammoth and the Elephant; sometimes with a Howdah or castle on its back 
 Mole (or moldiwarp)
 Porcupine
 Hedgehog (or urcheon).
 Beaver
 Squirrel
 Rabbits, Hares, and coneys
 Three hares
Seal

Reptiles and amphibians
 The serpent usually depicted nowed.
 Ouroboros
 The salamander is typically shown as a generic lizard, sometimes with a head of unusual shape often described as "dog-shaped", and always surrounded by flames. 
 The lizard
 The Biscione
 Dragon: by default a European one, but also a Chinese dragon.
 Wyvern: similar to a dragon, but with only two legs.
 Zilant: a form of dragon appearing in Russian heraldry.
 Tortoises and Turtles
 Dinosaurs

Insects
Insects include:
 Bee, often flying around beehives, natural or man-made
 Butterfly
 Dragonfly
 Emmet (heraldry)
 Flea
 Fly
 Grasshopper
 Scorpion
 Spider

Hybrids

 Sphinx: depicted with the head and breasts of a woman.
 Griffin, combining the head (but with ears), chest, wings and forelegs of the eagle with the hindquarters and legs of a lion (A sub-type of griffin, the Keythong lacks wings with the upper body having armor plate like feathers and its lower body is scattered with sharp spiny quills). See List of griffins as mascots and in heraldry.
 Unicorn, having a horse's body, deer's legs, goat's beard, and often a lion's tail
 The hippogriff is like the griffin except that the lion parts of the griffin are replaced by those of a horse.
 Harpy
 Theow is a wolf-like creature but with cloven hooves.
 The "sea-horse" (hippocampus) is depicted as half horse and half fish
 The sea-lion is a combination of a lion and a fish.
 Any combination of parts of other animals, e.g. winged reindeer, is possible.

Birds
By far the most frequent heraldic bird is the eagle. A variant is the alerion, without beak or feet, seen in the arms of the duchy of Lorraine (of which it is not quite an anagram).

Also very frequent is the martlet, a conventional swallow depicted without feet or the French variant the merlette, which also omits the beak.

 Auk
 Avalerion
 Cock
 Gallic rooster
 Cockatoo
 Coot, charge of the Coot family, Kilby family, Marsden family and the Southcott family.
 Cormorant
 Corvus
 Crane
 Dove
 Duck without beak or legs is called the merlette
 Eagle, usually displayed, i.e. with wings spread
 Alerion: eagle without beak or feet
 Aquila
 Double-headed eagle
 Triple-headed eagle
 Golden eagle#Heraldry and myth 
 Eagle of Saladin, a symbol associated with secular Arab nationalism, contrasted with the Hawk of Quraish
 Elephant bird
 Emu
 Falcon
 Garuda
 Goose
 Gull or seagull
Halcyon
 Hawk
 Hawk of Quraish, a symbol associated with political Islam and Arab monarchy, contrasted with the Eagle of Saladin 
 Heron
 Kiwi
 Kookaburra
 Magpie: Otton de Cazeneuve bore "Or, three magpies sable" at Falkirk.
 Martlet
 Moa
 Osprey: almost invariably depicted simply as an eagle argent, often maintaining (holding in its talons or beak) a fish
 Ostrich or its feathers
 Owl
 Papingo or Popinjay (parrot).
 Pelican, sometimes with its young.
When a pelican is blazoned as "vulning", it refers to a pelican injuring herself, while a pelican "in her piety" refers to a female pelican feeding her young with her own blood.
 Peacock often blazoned in its pride
 Phoenix
 Stork
 Swan
 Black swans
 Turkey cock: was a later immigrant from the New World
 Turul
 Egg: rare.

Fish and creatures of the sea
"Fish" are sometimes only described as "a fish", but the species is often named:
 Carp
 Catfish
 Cod
 Conger
 Crab
 Cuttlefish
 Dolphin
 Eel
 "Garvine fishes", in canting contexts
 The pike, also called a ged or Lucy
 Perch
 Roach
 Salmon
 Sturgeon
 Herring
 The seahorse is depicted as half horse and half fish, but if the natural seahorse is to be depicted it is blazoned as a "seahorse (hippocampus)".
 The whale
 The escallop (scallop shell)
 Mullet
 Mussels appear in the arms of Musselburgh in Scotland.
 Whelk shell
 Mermaid and Melusine
 Mahseer - used in Indian Muslim heraldry, such as the coat of arms of Bhopal State, Kurwai State, or the Kingdom of Oudh. See Mahseer in heraldry. 
 Octopus
 Squid

Parts of animals
Parts of creatures may also be used as charges.
 the Gamb (or limb) and the paw.
 Head
 Cabossed
 Antlers
 Teeth and tusks
 Wings
 Pizzle

Plants

Flowers

The fleur-de-lis
Jessant-de-lys
 Heraldic roses are shown in a stylised form similar to the wild rose. A rose on top of another rose form a double rose.
 though there are several unusual different types blazoned, such as the Luther rose.
 White Rose of York; Red Rose of Lancaster; Tudor Rose, which is a double rose.
 The lotus flower 
 The thistle
Other commonly used flower-like charges (called "foils") include:
 Trefoil (with three petals; usually slipped, with a stem)
 Quatrefoil (with four petals)
 Cinquefoil (with five petals)
 Hexafoil (with six petals)
 The septfoil (with seven petals)
 The double quatrefoil (with eight petals)—in England the rare cadency mark of a ninth son.
 Strawberries and the strawberry flowers depicted as cinquefoils
 Tulips
 Grapevines

Trees and their fruits
Trees appear as eradicated (showing the roots) or couped. Fruit can appear on a tree, or by itself. Also, leaves and branches appear.
 Tree trunk
 Apple tree
 Cherry
 Pears (with peartrees)
Coffee, including branches and beans

Other flora
 Maple leaf - symbol of Canada
 Shamrock - symbol of Ireland

Trees are sometimes merely blazoned as "a tree" but specific trees are mentioned in blazon.
 The oak and the acorn
 The pines and the pine-cone also called a pineapple. 
 Elm 
 Poplar, also called aspen
 Willow, also called Salix or Osiers; its branch is called a wand
 Alder
 Coconut tree
 Palm 
 Laurel trees
 Olive
 The pomegranate tree
 Cannabis
 Grass, often on a mound
 Seeblatt
A small group of trees is blazoned as a hurst, grove, wood or thicket.

Grain crops and vegetables

 Wheat occurs in the form of "garbs" or sheaves and as ears, though sometimes garbs represent another crop
 a garb of hay
 Ears of rye are depicted exactly as wheat, except the ears droop down.
 "Ginny wheat" or "guinea wheat" (like wheat but with a fatter ear) also exists
 Cabbage
 Leek

Inanimate charges

Regarding "inanimate objects", Fox-Davies (1909:281) comments:
"one can safely say that there is scarcely an object under the sun which has not at some time or other been introduced into a coat of arms or crest. One cannot usefully make a book on armory assume the character of a general encyclopedia on useful knowledge, and reference will only be made in this chapter to a limited number, including those which from frequent usage have obtained a recognised heraldic character."

Crosses

Originally representing the Christian cross used as field sign and standard during the Crusades, heraldic crosses diversified into many variants in the late medieval to early modern period, the most common (besides the plain "Greek cross") being the cross potent, cross pattée, cross fleury, cross moline, cross crosslet (etc.).

Lettering

Lettering in coats of arms are usually placed in the motto, not in the heraldic shield as a charge. However, a tradition of introducing individual letters as heraldic charges on the basis of acrophony originates in the 15th to 16th century, primarily in personal and municipal heraldry, and with some frequency in the modern period, appearing more often on the continent than in British heraldry where letters as charges have traditionally been discouraged. Fox-Davies (1909:281) regarding letters of the alphabet as heraldic charges:
"Instances of these are scarcely common, but the family of Kekitmore may be adduced as bearing 'Gules, three S's or,' while Bridlington Priory had for arms 'Per pale, sable and argent, three B's counterchanged.' [...] Corporate arms (in England) afford an instance of alphabetical letters in the case of the B's on the shield of Bermondsey."

One of the earliest instances of the use of letters as heraldic charges is that of the Langenmantel family of Augsburg. Rüdiger I Langenmantel (d. 1342), one of the leading figures of the Augsburg patriciate during the first four decades of the 14th century, is the founder of the "Langenmantel vom RR" branch of the family, derived from his coat of arms showing two letters R (for his given name), shown addorsed (as mirror images).

Religious symbolism:
Emblem of the Trinity
Alpha and Omega
Chi Rho
Christogram

Nature
 A sphere in an orbit.
 Sun
 A sun with rays is called a sun in splendour.
 The Moon
Crescents 
Also "in her plenitude" (a full moon with a face).
Stars
Star and crescent
Mullets represent stars or spur rowels. Stars can have any number of points, but if nothing is specified in the blazon it is usually five.
Estoiles are stars with six wavy rays; pole stars are differentiated.
 Magen David
 Constellations such as the Southern Cross.
 Astrological symbols such as Taurus
 clouds
 An atomic cloud
 A cumulonimbus cloud in the arms of the 362d Fighter Group of the United States Air Force
 A stylized cloud formation in the arms of the 23rd Air Division of the United States Air Force 
 A tornado in the arms of the 311th Fighter Group of the United States Air Force
 The planets such as Jupiter and Saturn. Also representing metals (Mars for iron, Venus for copper, Saturn for lead) 
 The armillary sphere or globe
 Lightning bolts, also called "lightning flashes", are shown in a stylized way.
 Thunderbolts, shown in a stylized way
 volcano
 A mount (mountain, hill hillock). A mount with three tops is known as trimount, for mounts with more than three tops, the number of tops is blazoned as coupeaux (as in, a mount with six coupeaux). When the mount is included in the lower part of the shield, it may be considered an ordinary rather than a charge.

Ships and boats

 The lymphad (a type of ancient ship)
 A Roman ship
 Viking ships
 Three-masted sailing ships
 A barque
 Anchor

Structures

 Religious Structures
 A belfry
 A steeple
 Cathedrals
churches of various types
 Chapels
Convents
 missions
 Abbey.
 Fortified buildings
 Castle, a castle of the generic type consists of two towers connected by an embattled wall (also a charge in heraldry). Varieties occur, such as being triangular or quadrangular. Also, the windows and doors can be of a different tincture, as well as the masonry. Sometimes they have domed towers.
 Towers can be combined with castles or have their own towers. They vary in the same way as castles.
 Portcullis
 Forts
 Columns
 Arches
 Mills, e.g. windmills
 Dovecotes
 Tents

Headgear
 Phrygian cap
 Liberty pole
 Mitre
 Torse
 Cap of maintenance
 Crowns or coronets, if not more precisely specified, have four leaves (three visible) and no arches. Varieties include:
 naval crown
 Royal Crown
 Imperial crown
 civic crown
 Eastern crown or Antique crown
 camp crown, crown vallary or crown palisado
 mural crown
 Crancelin, a crown of rue
 Papal tiara
 Helmets

Music

Musical instruments include:
 Harp
 Bugle-horn sometimes just called a horn.
 Bagpipes
 Bells, including church bells and hawks' bells
 Clarion
 Drum (shown as a "field drum")
 Post horn
 A sharp, flat, and natural

Weapons

 Axes of various types
Fasces
Labrys
 Battering ram
 Bow, including the longbow and crossbow, and arrow
Yoke and arrows
 Caltrop, displayed with one spike pointing upwards
 Cannon, including the culverin
 Grenade: similar in appearance to a cannonball with flames coming out of a flattened end.
 Lance and spear sometimes broken, usually of the tilting variety.
 Javelin
 Pheon and spear heads.
 Mace
 Musket
 Sword, including variants such as the scimitar, seax, and dagger
 Zulfiqar
Pennon, often referred to as a pile (military construction beam) or passion nail (tool); a type of flag used to signal battle commands.

Tools
 Anvil
 Fetterlock
 Fire brand
 Fire striker
 Fleam
 Hammers, of various types
Arm and hammer
Hammer and pick
Hammer and sickle
 Harrow
 Keys
 Millrind
 Nails, often passion nails (Arma Christi)
 Shovel
 Sickle
 Ladders typically take the form of scaling ladders.
 Rake
 Scales (weighing)
 Shuttle
 Surgeons' scalpels
 Trowel
 Tun
 Water-bougets A charge resembling the water bags that were used to supply the army in battle
 Wolfsangel

Clothing and other personal items
 Buckles in a variety of styles even in the form of a heart.
 The maunch is a lady's stylized sleeve.
 Spurs.
 chamber pots
 Chess rooks
 Collars
 Woolpack, an object resembling a pillow or cushion; found in municipal coats of arms in Surrey, England.

Other 

 A glass throughout, shattered, argent
The wheel is a carriage wheel unless otherwise specified
Books
 A winged wheel
 Catherine Wheel
 A millwheel or water wheel
 Cogwheel (used mainly in more recent coats-of-arms to represent heavy industry)
 The Japanese mon emblem has been used as heraldic charge in recent heraldry. It is blazoned in traditional heraldic style rather than in the Japanese style. An example is the Canadian-granted coat of arms of David Tsubouchi (1993).<ref name="Tsubouchi">Tsubouchi, David Hiroshi (Individual), Public Register of Arms, Flags, and Badges of Canada]</ref>

References

Fox-Davies, Arthur Charles, [https://archive.org/details/completeguidetoh00foxdrich A complete guide to heraldry'' (1909).

External links
 NGW.nl, List of heraldic charges (with images)
 A Heraldic Primer, SCA College of Arms on the Web